Hewanorra International Airport , located near Vieux Fort Quarter, Saint Lucia, in the Caribbean, is the larger of Saint Lucia's two airports and is managed by the Saint Lucia Air and Seaports Authority (SLASPA). It is on the southern cape of the island, about 53.4 km (33.2 mi) from the capital city, Castries.

The airport is a Fire Category 9 facility that handles 700,000 passengers a year and can accommodate Boeing 747, Airbus A330, Airbus A340, Boeing 777 and other long-range intercontinental jet aircraft. Aircraft maintenance is carried out by Caribbean Dispatch Services. The country's smaller airport, George F. L. Charles Airport, is located in the capital city of Castries and handles inter-Caribbean passenger flights, which are currently operated with regional turboprop aircraft as well as with smaller prop aircraft.

History 

Hewanorra International Airport was originally named Beane Army Airfield and was used as a military airfield by the United States Army Air Forces' Sixth Air Force during World War II. Beane Field was activated in early 1941 with a mission to defend Saint Lucia as well as the Caribbean region against an enemy attack.  It was subsequently renamed Beane Air Force Base and was operated by the U.S. Air Force before being closed in 1949.

The former military airbase was then refurbished and converted into a commercial airport. There is a disused northeast–southwest runway north of the main east–west runway that was part of the military airfield. It is in poor condition, along with a few dispersal pads.

The name of the airport is an Amerindian word meaning "(land of the) iguana".

Historical airline service
BWIA West Indies Airways (BWIA) introduced Boeing 727-100 "Sunjet" service into the airport in 1965 flying a round trip routing of Port of Spain, Trinidad - Barbados - St. Lucia - San Juan, Puerto Rico - Kingston, Jamaica - Montego Bay - Miami once a week.  By 1971, BWIA was operating Boeing 707 jet service on a round trip routing of Port of Spain - St. Lucia - Antigua - New York JFK Airport twice a week.

The Official Airline Guide (OAG) lists three airlines operating jet service into the airport during the mid and late 1970s:  British Airways, BWIA West Indies Airways (operating as BWIA International at this time), both flying Boeing 707 aircraft, and Eastern Airlines flying Boeing 727-100 aircraft. According to the OAG, all three air carriers were operating jet flights into the airport from other islands in the Caribbean at this time with British Airways also flying nonstop and direct service into the airport from London Heathrow Airport.  The Feb. 1, 1976 OAG lists weekly nonstop Boeing 707 flights operated by British Airways from both Barbados and Port of Spain with these flights originating in London and also lists flights operated by Eastern with Boeing 727-100  service nonstop from Fort de France, Pointe a Pitre and Port of Spain as well as direct, no change of plane 727 flights from San Juan and St. Croix with same day connecting Eastern service being offered four days a week from Atlanta, Baltimore, Boston, Chicago, Detroit, Miami, New York City and Pittsburgh via its Caribbean hub in San Juan, Puerto Rico.  Also in 1976, according to its system timetable, BWIA International was operating nonstop Boeing 707 service into the airport from Port of Spain twice a week as well as weekly nonstop 707 flights from both Antigua and Barbados with connecting 707 flights twice a week from New York City being operated via either Antigua or Barbados.

British Airways and BWIA International were serving the airport with wide body jetliners in 1993 with British Airways operating Boeing 747-200 aircraft and BWIA operating Lockheed L-1011 Tristar series 500 aircraft.  According to the OAG, BWIA International was operating nonstop service from Frankfurt, Germany and London Heathrow Airport as well as direct one stop service from Zurich, Switzerland while British Airways was operating direct one stop service from London Gatwick Airport at this time.

In 1994, American Airlines was operating daily direct Boeing 727-200 service from Washington Dulles Airport via a stop at San Juan, Puerto Rico, as well operating nonstop Boeing 757-200 service on the weekends from New York Kennedy Airport. Leisure Air also operated a nonstop flight from New York JFK Airport once a week with an Airbus A320, while BWIA was operating direct McDonnell Douglas MD-80 flights three days a week from Miami via a stop at Antigua. By the next year, American was operating larger Boeing 767-300 wide body jetliners on its weekend nonstop service from New York JFK Airport in addition to daily direct wide body Airbus A300 service from New York JFK via an intermediate stop in San Juan, Puerto Rico, while British Airways was operating nonstop Boeing 747-200 service from both Antigua and Barbados several days a week with these services originating at London Gatwick Airport. Also in 1995, BWIA was operating nonstop McDonnell Douglas MD-80 service from New York JFK Airport four days a week, as well as direct MD-80 flights four days a week from Miami via a stop in Antigua in addition to wide body Lockheed L-1011 series 500 service nonstop from Antigua, Barbados and Port of Spain several days a week with these flights then operating continuing transatlantic service to either London Heathrow Airport, Frankfurt or Zurich while Air Canada was operating weekend nonstop service from Toronto with Airbus A320 and wide body Boeing 767-200 jets.

Expansion 
Officials have proposed a new terminal building at Hewanorra to accommodate Saint Lucia's growing tourism industry. It is envisaged that the new terminal would be more than twice as large as the current facility, equipped with 6 to 8 jet bridges and a proposed 13 parking positions, including one stand capable of handling the Airbus A380. Currently, the airport has seven parking positions: two for wide-body aircraft, two behind those, and three for medium-sized aircraft such as the Airbus A320 and Boeing 757.

Under a master plan, the runway will also be widened. At , Hewanorra's runway is already long enough to handle most commercial aircraft. However, its  width is insufficient to handle the Airbus A380, which requires  from shoulder to shoulder and a length of at least . There are also plans to exploit a disused concrete runway to the north of the airport, which was built by the American military during World War II and could be recommissioned as a taxiway for cargo operations and access to hangars. One proposal is to move cargo operations to the north side of the airport, putting in all the requisite infrastructure as well as two stands for aircraft up to Boeing 747 freighter size.

This project is hoped to be financed by the increased airport tax, which is now approximately XCD 290 (approx. USD 107,30) for each passenger.

Runway and taxiways
The airport uses a single east–west runway, connected by two taxiways at its midsection, with turning bays at the end for back-tracking. As a result of the trade winds that blow northeast across Saint Lucia, all aircraft usually arrive and depart in an easterly direction. This results in a typical flight path for arriving aircraft along the west coast of Saint Lucia, while departing flights usually fly along the east coast of the island. On relatively rare occasions, weather disturbances such as passing hurricanes or tropical systems may force planes to take off or land in a westerly direction.

The airport is equipped with RNAV, VOR/DME, and NDB approaches.

Other facilities
The airport houses the Hewanorra Outstation of the Eastern Caribbean Civil Aviation Authority.

Airlines and destinations

Passenger

Cargo

Accidents and incidents
Quebecair flight 714, a charter flight operated with a Boeing 707-123B from Toronto, crashed on its approach to Hewanorra International Airport on 19 February 1979. Wind shear caused the aircraft to halt its descent. The copilot, who was flying at the time, retarded the throttles, but the aircraft had just passed the wind shear zone, and the nose slammed into the runway and bounced twice, destroying the nose landing gear. There were no fatalities and only minor injuries. The aircraft was damaged beyond repair and was written off.

Virgin Atlantic flight 98 from A.N.R. Robinson International Airport on the island of Tobago landed on a flooded runway at the airport on 24 December 2013.  The Airbus A330 sustained damage to panels on the underside of the aircraft near the pack bay. The adjacent Petite Riviere Du Vieux Fort had flooded and Eastern Caribbean Civil Aviation Authority investigators concluded the aircraft landed in one to two feet of water.

References

External links

 

1941 establishments in the British Empire
Airports established in 1941
Airports in Saint Lucia
Vieux Fort, Saint Lucia